Weston may refer to:

Places

Australia 
 Weston, Australian Capital Territory, a suburb of Canberra
 Weston, New South Wales
 Weston Creek, a residential district of Canberra
 Weston Park, Canberra, a park

Canada 
 Weston, Nova Scotia
 Weston, Toronto, Ontario
 Weston GO Station, a station in the GO Transit network located in the community
 Weston, Winnipeg
 Weston Island, an uninhabited island in James Bay

United Kingdom 
 Weston, Berkshire
 Weston, Cheshire East, a village near Crewe
 Weston, Runcorn, Cheshire
 Weston-on-Trent, Derbyshire
 Weston, Devon (near Sidmouth)
 Weston, Awliscombe, a location
 Weston, Dorset (on the Isle of Portland)
 Weston, Corscombe, a location
 Weston, East Hampshire, Hampshire (near Petersfield)
 Weston, Southampton, Hampshire (a suburb)
 Weston Secondary School
 Weston, Herefordshire
 Weston, Hertfordshire
 Weston under Penyard, Herefordshire 
 Weston, Lincolnshire
 Weston Longville, Norfolk
 Weston, Northamptonshire
 Weston, North Yorkshire
 Weston, Nottinghamshire
 Weston-on-the-Green, Oxfordshire
 Weston, Pembrokeshire, a location
 Weston, Monkhopton, a location in Shropshire
 Weston, Oswestry Rural, a location in Shropshire
 Weston, Stowe, a location in Shropshire
 Weston Rhyn, Shropshire
 Weston-under-Redcastle, Shropshire
 Weston, Bath, Somerset
 Weston in Gordano, Somerset
 Weston-super-Mare, Somerset
 Weston, South Lanarkshire, a location
 Weston, Staffordshire (near Stafford)
 Weston Coyney, Staffordshire
 Weston-under-Lizard, Staffordshire
 Weston, Suffolk
 Weston-by-Cherington in Long Compton, Warwickshire
 Weston-on-Avon, Warwickshire
 Weston under Wetherley, Warwickshire

United States 
 Weston, Colorado
 Weston, Connecticut, a New England town
 Weston (CDP), Connecticut, the main village in the town
 Weston (Middletown, Delaware), a historic home and farm
 Weston, Florida
 Weston, Georgia
 Weston, Idaho
 Weston, DuPage County, Illinois, defunct, grounds of Fermilab
 Weston, McLean County, Illinois
 Weston, Iowa
 Weston, Kentucky
 Weston, Louisiana
 Weston, Maine
 Weston, Massachusetts
 Weston, Michigan
 Weston, Missouri
 Weston, Nebraska
 Weston, New Jersey
 Weston Mills, New York
 New Weston, Ohio
 Weston, Ohio
 Weston, Oregon
 Weston, Pennsylvania
 Weston, Texas
 Weston, Vermont
 Weston, Washington
 Weston (Casanova, Virginia), a historic home and farm
 Weston, West Virginia
 Weston, Wisconsin, a village in Marathon County
 Weston, Clark County, Wisconsin
 Weston, Dunn County, Wisconsin
 Weston, Wyoming
 Weston County, Wyoming

Other places 
 Weston, Sabah, Malaysia
 Weston, New Zealand

Groups and organizations 
 Weston (band), a pop-punk/indie band from Pennsylvania
 Weston-super-Mare A.F.C., a semi-professional football club in Weston-super-Mare, Somerset, England
 Weston Workers Bears FC, a football club in Weston, New South Wales, Australia
 George Weston Limited, a Canadian food production and distribution company
 J. M. Weston, a French shoe company
 Weston Electrical Instrument Corporation, a company founded by Edward Weston

Other uses 
 Weston (surname), people with the surname Weston
 Weston (software), the reference implementation of a Wayland compositor
 Weston cell, an electrochemical element

See also 

 George Weston Foods, an Australian food company
 George Weston (disambiguation)
 Weston, Wisconsin (disambiguation)
 Westons (disambiguation)